Alessandro Heinrich Rütten (born 2 August 1996 in Heinsberg, Germany), formerly known by his stage names Sandro Nicolas, Sammy Clay, TYLR and currently Leo Dante, is a German singer-songwriter.

Career
Rütten was born in Heinsberg, Germany, as Alessandro Rütten to a Greek-German mother and a German father. Part of his paternal family lives in the US. He was raised in Germany, where he started his career in music.

In 2018, as Alessandro Rütten, he participated in season 8 of The Voice of Germany (the German version of The Voice). He performed Shawn Mendes' "In My Blood" in the Blind Auditions, and all four coaches turned for him. He was eliminated in the Sing Off round.

In 2019, performing as Sandro Nicolas, he represented the United States in the New Wave competition in Sochi, Russia and finished in 5th place. 

Later in 2019, he was internally selected by the Cypriot broadcaster CyBC to represent Cyprus in the Eurovision Song Contest 2020 in Rotterdam, Netherlands. He was due to perform the song "Running" under the mononym Sandro. However, the contest was later cancelled due to the COVID-19 pandemic and CyBC did not invite him back for 2021. In May 2020, he was part of the joint European broadcast of Eurovision: Europe Shine a Light.

In 2020, Rütten rebranded himself with the stage name of Sammy Clay. In 2021, Rütten rebranded himself again with the stage name TYLR. In 2022, Rütten took on yet another stage name, this time calling himself Leo Dante.

References

1996 births
American people of Greek descent
Eurovision Song Contest entrants for Cyprus
Eurovision Song Contest entrants of 2020
German people of American descent
German people of Greek descent
21st-century German male singers
Greek pop singers
Living people
People from Heinsberg